The Ball Street Journal is the tenth studio album by rapper E-40. It was released on November 24, 2008. The first single from the album is "Wake It Up" featuring Akon, while the second is "Break Ya Ankles" featuring Shawty Lo. The album debuted at number 42 on the U.S. Billboard 200 chart, with 50,000 copies in its first-week of sales, and has since sold over 450,000 copies.

The album features guest appearances by Shawty Lo, Turf Talk, The Game, Snoop Dogg, T-Pain, Rock City, Akon, Bun B, Gucci Mane, Sammie, Ice-T, Too Short, Cousin Fik, Kevin Cossom, B-Legit, Bosko & Suga-T. A photo shoot of the album appeared in an episode of the second season of From G's to Gents. "Got Rich Twice" featuring Turf Talk was released as a promo single on September 30, 2008, while "Poor Man's Hydraulics" was released as a promo single on October 28.

Track listing

Charts

Weekly charts

Year-end charts

References

2008 albums
E-40 albums
Asylum Records albums
Warner Records albums
Albums produced by Lil Jon
Albums produced by Rick Rock
Albums produced by J. R. Rotem
Albums produced by T-Pain
Albums produced by Droop-E
Albums produced by Bosko
Sick Wid It Records albums